Leandro António Coelho Pimenta (born 9 July 1990) is a Portuguese professional footballer who plays for Imortal D.C. as a midfielder.

Club career
Born in Albufeira, Algarve, Pimenta joined S.L. Benfica's academy at the age of 15. He spent his first three seasons as a senior on loan in the Segunda Liga, representing in quick succession S.C. Beira-Mar, C.D. Fátima and Atlético Clube de Portugal. He scored his first goal as a professional while at the service of the latter club, the only in a 1–0 away win against Portimonense S.C. on 5 November 2011.

Pimenta returned to Benfica for the 2012–13 season, as part of the newly created reserve team who competed in the second division. On 11 December 2012, he renewed his contract until 2016 with a buyout clause of €30 million.

On 17 July 2013, Pimenta signed a three-year deal with Gil Vicente FC. He made his debut in the Primeira Liga on 18 August, starting in the 2–0 home victory over Académica de Coimbra.

Pimenta returned to the second tier in January 2016, joining S.C. Freamunde as of 1 July. On 31 January 2019, he moved to S.C. Covilhã of the same league from lowly AD Fafe.

International career
Pimenta won the first of two caps for Portugal at under-21 level on 9 August 2011, coming on as a late substitute in a 1–1 friendly draw with Slovakia held in Estoril.

Honours
Beira-Mar
Segunda Liga: 2009–10

References

External links

1990 births
Living people
People from Albufeira
Sportspeople from Faro District
Portuguese footballers
Association football midfielders
Primeira Liga players
Liga Portugal 2 players
Campeonato de Portugal (league) players
Imortal D.C. players
S.C. Beira-Mar players
C.D. Fátima players
Atlético Clube de Portugal players
S.L. Benfica B players
Gil Vicente F.C. players
S.C. Freamunde players
AD Fafe players
S.C. Covilhã players
Portugal youth international footballers
Portugal under-21 international footballers